RIPM Jazz Periodicals is a searchable database of full-text, mostly out-of-print, rare jazz periodicals, published by Répertoire international de la presse musicale (Retrospective Index to Music Periodicals), commonly known as RIPM. Updated annually with new full-text journals including full citations, RIPM Jazz Periodicals currently contains 119 American (U.S.) jazz journals and magazines published from 1914 to 2010. A full list of titles, including publication information and sample journal covers, is available on the RIPM Jazz gallery page.

Background 
RIPM Jazz Periodicals was developed to preserve and provide access to the historic jazz periodical literature in order to facilitate the study of jazz history and to address a number of longstanding issues that rendered this large body of literature unavailable: (i) most jazz journals and magazines are out-of-print, in poor physical condition, and/or found in very few libraries; (ii) the lack of complete runs; (iii) the difficulty encountered when one attempts to locate specific information within an available source; and, (iv) the difficulty distinguishing those publications that are significant from those of lesser interest, aside from a handful of recognized titles.

Collaborators 
In 2014 RIPM and the Institute of Jazz Studies (IJS) at Rutgers University-Newark signed an agreement to collaborate on the creation of RIPM Jazz Periodicals. In addition, through RIPM’s Partner and Participating Library Program, RIPM gained access to journals in a number of other collections including those of the Library of Congress, Yale University, the University of North Texas, the University of Illinois-Urbana Champaign, Oberlin College, and the Peabody Institute of the Johns Hopkins University—all holding material that complements the IJS collection.

References

External links 
 Official website

Music databases
History of jazz